DC Towers (also known as Donau City Towers) refers to a construction project in Vienna's District Donaustadt. The towers are designed by French architect Dominique Perrault.

Construction timing
DC Tower 1, the tallest skyscraper in Austria at 220 metres high (250 metres including the antenna spire), was officially finished with an opening ceremony on 26 February 2014 attended by architect Dominique Perrault and former astronaut Buzz Aldrin. Due to the global financial crisis of 2007, ground breaking had been delayed several times. Eventually, construction was started on 17 June 2010. 

As of June 2012, tenants were confirmed for 50 percent of the floor space according to the owner Wiener Entwicklungsgesellschaft für den Donauraum. Most of the available floor space will be used for offices. Baxter International has been confirmed as one of the largest tenants. The upper floors will be used for apartments, while the first 15 floors will house a four-star hotel operated by the Spanish Sol Meliá Group. There will also be a restaurant in one of the top floors.

DC Tower 2 will reach 180 metres, making it Vienna's fourth tallest building. It will house offices, shops and rental flats.

References

External links
 
  

Buildings and structures under construction in Austria
Buildings and structures in Donaustadt
Skyscrapers in Vienna
Twin towers
Skyscraper office buildings in Austria